Dar Zanguiyeh (also Romanized as Dar Zangū’īyeh; also known as Dar Zangū and Zangū’īyeh) is a village in Maskun Rural District, Jebalbarez District, Jiroft County, Kerman Province, Iran. At the 2006 census, its population was 154, in 32 families.

References 

Populated places in Jiroft County